The 1991 IAAF World Women's Road Race Championships was the ninth and final edition of the annual international road running competition organised by the International Amateur Athletics Federation (IAAF). The competition was hosted by the Netherlands on 13 October 1991 in Nieuwegein and featured one race only: a 15K run for women. There were individual and team awards available, with the national team rankings being decided by the combined finishing positions of a team's top three runners. Countries with fewer than three finishers were not ranked.

Romania's Iulia Olteanu defended her title from the 1990 race with a winning time of 48:42 minutes. In the tightest ever finish seen in the competition's history, four women finished within the space of three seconds. Andrea Wallace of Great Britain took the runner-up spot while Germany's Uta Pippig edged out Soviet athlete Nadezhda Ilyina for third place by a fraction of a second. Pippig led Germany to its first team title at the competition with the former East German being backed up by former West German teammates Kerstin Pressler and Iris Biba. The Romanian women, headed by Olteanu, were two points adrift in second, with Georgeta State in seventh and Nuța Olaru in 16th place. In third, the Soviet Union took a sixth consecutive team medal (having reached the podium on every occasion it entered a team) through the performances of Ilyina, Marina Rodchenkova and Yelena Zhupiyeva.

The ending of this championships series coincided with the IAAF launching the 1992 IAAF World Half Marathon Championships a year later, thus a women's road world championship remained in the form of the half marathon distance.

Results

Individual

Team

References

1991
IAAF World Women's Road Race Championships
IAAF World Women's Road Race Championships
IAAF World Women's Road Race Championships
International athletics competitions hosted by the Netherlands
Sports competitions in Utrecht (province)
Sport in Nieuwegein